Sebastião "Tião" Amorim Gimenez, also commonly known as Tião (born 31 May 1925), is a Brazilian former basketball player who competed in the 1952 Summer Olympics.

References

External links
  

1925 births
Possibly living people
Brazilian men's basketball players
Olympic basketball players of Brazil
Basketball players at the 1951 Pan American Games
Basketball players at the 1952 Summer Olympics
Pan American Games medalists in basketball
Pan American Games bronze medalists for Brazil
Medalists at the 1951 Pan American Games
1950 FIBA World Championship players